The Soling was an event on the 2012 Vintage Yachting Games program at Lake Como, Italy. Six out of the nine scheduled race were completed. Seven nations entered 39 sailors in 13 boats.

Venue overview

Race area and course
Of the three Campos (Race areas) available for the 2012 Vintage Yachting Games at Lake Como Campo Charlie was used for the Soling event. This Campo is situated in front of the city of Bellano.

For the 2012 edition of the Vintage Yachting Games, three different courses were available. The Soling could only use course 2.

Wind conditions 
The northern part of Lake Como is reportedly a thermic wind venue. At this time of year, the normal situation is that at about 1 pm the Swiss mountains are heated up and a southern wind hits the racing areas at about 10 to 14 knots. As a result of this, no races are scheduled in the morning. Unfortunately, during the event, the temperature in Switzerland was low. Also, the thermal south breeze battled with the gradient wind from the north. As a result, the actual wind did not rise above eight knots during the races and was unstable at times.

Campo Bravo has normally a tendency to have a slightly higher wind speed than the two other Campos due to it being more northern than Charlie so that the southern thermal breeze is strengthened and to the lake narrowing in  front of Dervio.

Races

Summary 
In the Soling six out of the planned nine races were completed.

The Soling class (Olympic between 1972–2000) brought the top sailors of their countries to Lake Como. When the races started it could be anyone's series. When the dust of the first two days of racing was settled, Peter Neumann, Rudolf Rager, Rudolf Hubauer from Austria, Igor Yushko, Sergiy Pichugin, Dmitriy Yarmolenka from Ukraine and Rudy den Outer, Gavin Lidlow, Ramzi Souli from The Netherlands,  were battling for gold. In the final race, the decision came: UKR gold, AUT bronze and NED silver.

Results 

 dnc = did not compete
 dns = did not start
 dnf = did not finish
 dsq = disqualified
 ocs = on course side
 ret = retired after finish
 Crossed out results did not count for the total result.

Daily standings

Victors

Notes

References 
 

Soling